Agonopterix capreolella is a moth of the family Depressariidae. It is found in most of Europe, the eastern Palearctic realm, and the Near East.

The wingspan is 15–19 mm. The forewings are light fuscous; base pale; first discal stigma black, preceded by a similar dot obliquely above it, second white, obscurely dark-edged, preceded by a similar dot; dark fuscous terminal dots. Hindwings are whitish-fuscous, darker terminally.
The larva is green; dorsal and subdorsal lines darker; head and plate of 2 black.

Adults are on wing from August to May.

The larvae feed on Pimpinella saxifraga, Daucus carota, and Sium latifolium.

References

External links 
 Swedish Moths
 Fauna Europaea

Agonopterix
Moths of Europe
Moths of Asia
Moths described in 1839